Takashi Nishiyama (Japanese: 西山隆志), sometimes credited as Piston Takashi, Nishiyama or T. Nishiyama, is a Japanese video game designer, director and producer who worked for Irem, Capcom and SNK before founding his own company Dimps. He is best known for developing Kung-Fu Master, Street Fighter, and Fatal Fury.

Career
Takashi Nishiyama started his career at Irem. He worked on the game design of the 1982 scrolling shooter Moon Patrol, one of the first games with parallax scrolling. He was also the designer of Kung-Fu Master (1984), called Spartan X in Japan. It is based on two Hong Kong martial arts films: the Jackie Chan and Sammo Hung film Wheels on Meals (1984), called Spartan X in Japan, and especially the Bruce Lee film Game of Death (1972). Kung-Fu Master is considered the first beat 'em up game, becoming the prototype for most subsequent martial arts games in the late 1980s. The NES port, Kung Fu, was programmed by a Nintendo team under the direction of Shigeru Miyamoto, later influencing his work on Super Mario Bros. (1985).

During the development of Kung-Fu Master, Nishiyama was invited to join Capcom by its founder Kenzo Tsujimoto, after he had left Irem. He eventually decided to leave Irem and join Capcom before the game was complete. Following its release, Nishiyama was hired by Capcom. He designed an arcade successor for Capcom, Trojan (1986), which evolved the basic gameplay concepts of Kung-Fu Master. The NES port included a one-on-one fighting mode, for the first time in a Capcom game. He then came up with the concept for a game centered entirely around the boss fights in Kung-Fu Master. This led to his creation of the Street Fighter fighting game franchise. Along with Hiroshi Matsumoto, he directed the original Street Fighter (1987). He created the special moves for Ryu called "Hadouken", which he says was inspired by an energy missile attack from the 1970s anime series Space Battleship Yamato. He then left Capcom and did not return to work on the sequel Street Fighter II: The World Warrior.

Nishiyama then joined SNK, after they had invited him to join the company. His first project there was the Neo Geo system, which he helped develop; he proposed the initial concept of an arcade system that uses ROM cartridges like a game console, and also proposed a home console version of the system. His reasons for these proposals was to make the system cheaper for markets such as China, Hong Kong, Taiwan, Southeast Asia, Central America, and South America, where it was difficult to sell dedicated arcade games due to piracy. Nishiyama then created the Fatal Fury fighting game franchise, as a spiritual successor to the original Street Fighter. He also worked on the fighting game franchises Art of Fighting and The King of Fighters, as well as the run and gun video game series Metal Slug. He then left SNK and founded the game development company Dimps in 2000.

Games
Moon Patrol (1982) (game designer)
Kung-Fu Master (1984) (game designer)
Section Z (1985) (game designer)
Trojan (1986) (game designer)
Legendary Wings (1986) (director)
Mega Man (1987) (producer)
Avengers (1987) (director)
Street Fighter (1987) (director)
Last Duel: Inter Planet War 2012 (1988) (director)
Mad Gear / LED Storm (1989) (game planner)
Ghost Pilots (1991) (executive producer)
Fatal Fury: King of Fighters (1991) (director)
Mutation Nation (1992) (special thanks)
The King of Fighters '94 (1994) (producer)
Fatal Fury 3: Road to the Final Victory (1995) (producer)
Real Bout Fatal Fury (1995) (producer)
Real Bout Fatal Fury Special (1997) (producer)
The King of Fighters '97 (1997) (producer)
Metal Slug 2 (1998) (producer)
Real Bout Fatal Fury 2: The Newcomers (1998) (executive producer)
The King of Fighters '98: The Slugfest (1998)(producer)
Samurai Shodown: Warriors Rage (1999) (executive producer)
The King of Fighters '99 (1999) (producer)
Metal Slug X (1999) (producer)
Metal Slug 3 (2000) (producer)
Star Ocean: Till the End of Time (2003) (item designer) 
Street Fighter IV (2008) (executive producer)

References

External links
 Dimps Digital Innovator

Art of Fighting
Capcom people
Fatal Fury
Irem
Japanese video game designers
Japanese video game directors
Japanese video game producers
Metal Slug
The King of Fighters
SNK
Street Fighter